Archie W. Butcher (April 29, 1901 – May 29, 1981) was an American football player and coach.  He served as the head football coach at Ottawa University in Ottawa, Kansas from 1928 to 1929 and at Oklahoma Baptist University in 1930, compiling a career college football record of 6–18–1. Butcher was also the head basketball coach at Oklahoma Baptist for one season, in 1930–31, tallying a mark of 5–10.

He obtained a degree in medicine from the University of Kansas School of Medicine in 1935, practicing in Miltonvale and Wakefield before moving to Abilene where he retired in 1976. Butcher died in 1981 at the age of 80.

Head coaching record

Football

References

External links
 

1901 births
1981 deaths
American football running backs
Basketball coaches from Kansas
Kansas State Wildcats football players
Oklahoma Baptist Bison basketball coaches
Oklahoma Baptist Bison football coaches
Ottawa Braves football coaches
People from Solomon, Kansas
People from Cloud County, Kansas
People from Clay County, Kansas
People from Abilene, Kansas